The Glick–Sower House, also known as the Susie Sower House, is located in Marshalltown, Iowa. The house was built in 1859 for Dr. George Glick and has been listed on the National Register of Historic Places since 1993. It is operated as a historic house museum by the Historical Society of Marshall County.

History 
Dr. Glick, an early founder and promoter of Marshalltown sold his home to the George Sower family in 1870. George Sower emigrated from Germany in the 1840s and worked  in the newspaper business, founding the Marshall Times, now known as the Marshalltown Times Republican. The home was owned by the Sower family until 1952, when Susie Sower willed the estate to the citizens of Marshall County.

References

External links
 Historical Society of Marshall County

Houses completed in 1859
Houses in Marshall County, Iowa
Buildings and structures in Marshalltown, Iowa
Museums in Marshall County, Iowa
Historic house museums in Iowa
Houses on the National Register of Historic Places in Iowa
National Register of Historic Places in Marshall County, Iowa